SCIDES or South Central Interior Distance Education School is a distance education school which teaches elementary, middle, and high school programs online. SCIDES also provides programs for both graduated adults (upgrading) and non-graduated adults (adult graduation programs). It is an accredited public school, and as such is tuition free. SCIDES offers over 150 courses, all of which are authorized by the BC Ministry of Education and taught by BC certified teachers. SCIDES is open 12 months of the year and offers continuous enrollment. SCIDES is able to provide cross-enrollment for students in brick-and-mortar schools or full-time school program options. SCIDES headquarters is located in Merritt, British Columbia, and is part of School District 58.

History
SCIDES is one of the 9 distance education schools initiated in BC in 1990, and is now one of over 50 in the province.

References

Online schools in Canada
Elementary schools in British Columbia
High schools in British Columbia
Educational institutions in Canada with year of establishment missing